The History of slavery in Iran (Persia) during various ancient, medieval, and modern periods is sparsely catalogued.

Slavery in Pre-Achaemenid Iran 
Slaves are attested in the cuneiform record of the ancient Elamites, a non-Persian people who inhabited modern southwestern Iran, including the ancient cities of Anshan and Susa, and who were eventually incorporated into the Achaemenid Empire. Because of their participation in cuneiform culture, the Elamites are one of the few pre-Achaemenid civilizations of Iran to leave written attestations of slavery, and details of slavery among the Gutians, Kassites, Medes, Mannaeans, and other preliterate peoples of Bronze Age Iran are largely unrecorded.

Classical Antiquity

Slavery in the Achaemenid Empire (c. 550–330 BC) 

Slavery was an existing institution in Egypt, Media and Babylonia before the rise of the Achaemenid empire.

The most common word used to designate a slave in the Achaemenid was bandaka-, which was also used to express general dependence. In his writing, Darius I uses this word to refer to his satraps and generals. Greek writers of the time expressed that all Persian people were slaves to their king. Other terms used to describe slaves within the empire could also have other meanings; such as "kurtaš" and "māniya-", which could mean hired or indentured workers in some contexts.

Herodotus has mentioned enslavement with regards to rebels of the Lydians who revolted against Achaemenid rule and captured Sardis.  He has also mentioned slavery after the rebellion of Egypt in the city of Barce during the time of Cambyses and the assassination of Persian Satrap in Egypt.  He also mentions the defeat of Ionians, and their allies Eretria who supported the Ionians and subsequent enslavement of the rebels and supporting population.

Xenophon at his work Anabasis mention slaves in the Persian Empire. For example, he writes about the slaves of Asidates when he is describing a night raid .

Under the Achaemenids, Persian nobles in Babylonia and other conquered states became large slave owners. They recruited a substantial number of their domestic slaves from these vanquished peoples. The Babylonians were required to supply an annual tribute of 500 boys. Information on privately owned slaves is scarce, but there are surviving cuniform documents from Babylonia and the Persepolis Administrative Archives which record slave sales and contracts.

According to  Muhammad A. Dandamayev:

Slavery in Hellenistic Iran (c. 330–238 BC)

Slavery in Parthian Iran (c. 238 BC–224 AD) 

According to Plutarch, there were many slaves in the army of the Parthian general Surena. The meaning of the term "slaves" (doûloi) mentioned in this context is disputed, as it may be pejorative rather than literal.

Plutarch also mentions that after the Romans were defeated in the Battle of Carrhae all the surviving Roman legionnaires were enslaved by the Parthians.

Slavery in Sasanian Iran (c. 224–642 AD)

Under this period Roman prisoners of war were used in farming in Babylonia, Shush, and Persis.

Sasanian Laws of Slavery 

Some of the laws governing the ownership and treatment of slaves can be found in the legal compilation called the Matigan-i Hazar Datistan, a collection of rulings by Sasanian judges. Principles that can be inferred from the laws include:

 Sources of slaves were both foreign (e.g., non-Zoroastrians captives from warfare or raiding or slaves imported from outside the Empire by traders) or domestic (e.g., hereditary slaves, children sold into slavery by their fathers, or criminals enslaved as punishment). Some cases suggest that a criminal's family might also be condemned to servitude. At the time of the manuscript's composition, Iranian slavery was hereditary on the mother's side (so that a child of a free man and a slave woman would be a slave), although the author reports that in earlier Persian history it may have been the opposite, being inherited from the father's side. 
 Slave-owners had the right to the slaves' income.
 While slaves were formally chattel (property) and were liable to the same legal treatment as nonhuman property (for example, they could be sold at will, rented, owned jointly, inherited, given as security for a loan, etc.), Sasanian courts did not treat them completely as objects; for example, slaves were allowed to testify in court in cases concerning them, rather than only permitted to be represented by their owners.
 Slaves were often given to the Zoroastrian fire temples as a pious offering, in which case they and their descendants would become temple-slaves.
 Excessive cruelty towards slaves could result in the owners' being brought to court; a court case involving a slave whose owner tried to drown him in the Tigris River is recorded, though without stating the outcome of the case.
 If a non-Zoroastrian slave, such as a Christian slave, converted to Zoroastrianism, he or she could pay his or her price and attain freedom; i.e., as long as the owner was compensated, manumission was required.
 Owners could also voluntarily manumit their slaves, in which case the former slave became a subject of the Sasanian King of Kings and could not lawfully be re-enslaved later. Manumissions were recorded, which suggests that a freedman who was challenged would be able to document their free status.
 Uniquely in comparison to Western slave systems, Sasanian slavery recognized partial manumission (relevant in the case of a jointly owned slave, only some of whose owners were willing to manumit). In case of a slave who was, e.g., one-half manumitted, the slave would serve in alternating years.

To free a slave (irrespective of his or her faith) was considered a  good deed. Slaves had some rights including keeping gifts from the owner and at least three days of rest in the month.

Medieval Iran

Slavery under the Umayyads, Abbasids, and Persianate Muslim dynasties (c. 642–1220 AD)

After the Islamic conquest of Iran, slavery and slave trade came to be similar to those conducted in other Muslim regions, and were directed toward non-Muslims. The slaves were provided to Iran and from Iran to the Abbasid Caliphate from four directions; domestic slave trade of non-Muslims within Iran; the slave trade from Central Asia; the slave trade from the Volga trade route and Caucasus; and the Indian slave trade.

According to Islamic practice of slavery and slave trade, non-Muslims were free to be enslaved, and since many parts of Iran remained Zoroastrian the first centuries after conquest, some non-Muslim "infidel territory" were exposed to Muslim slave raids, particularly Daylam in northwestern Iran and the Pagan mountainous region of Ḡūr in central Afghanistan.   Persian Zoroastrian slaves became common in the Umayyad and Abbasid Caliphate, and many of the mothers, concubines, and slave qiyan musicians are identified as originally Persian.  
 
The slave trade of the Samanid Empire in Central Asia was a major provider of slaves to Iran and the Middle East through northeastern Iran.   The major part of slaves from Central Asia were Turkic, captured through raids, or sold by their families or as war prisoners by other Turkic tribes, and Turkic slaves came to be the most popular ethnicity for slaves in Iran.

A third slave route through northwestern Iran provided Turkic slaves, people from Caucasus as well as saqaliba (Europeans) by the Volga trade route, and Christian Greeks, Armenians, and Georgians from the Caucasus through the Muslim raids in the Caucasus region.  
The Muslim invasion of northern India also resulted in a slave route of Hindu Indians through warfare and slave raids.

The slaves were used in Iran itself, particular in the households of the Muslim governors, but Iran was also a great transfer area of the slave trade to the Abbasid Caliphate.   The use of domestic slaves was of the kind common in Islamic regions. Enslaved women were used as concubines of the harems or female slaves to serve them, and male slaves were castrated to become eunuchs who guarded them, and black men were preferred as eunuchs because they were regarded to be unattractive.   Slaves were also employed as entertainers and for secretarial and financial duties, as musicians, as soldiers, as tenders of farm animals and horses, and as domestics and cooks. There would also have been agricultural slave workers in Iran, but the information about them are insufficient.

Slavery under Mongol and Turkoman rule (c. 1220–1502 AD)

Slaves were procured through warfare, slave raids, by purchase or as gifts.

Both male and female slaves were used for domestic service and sexual objects.  The use of slaves for military service, initially disappeared during the Mongol period, but it was revived and became important again during the reign of Ghazan (r. 1295-1304).   Timur Lenk “had as many as a thousand captives, who were skillful workmen, and laboured all the year round at making head pieces, and bows and arrows”.

Early Modern Iran

Slavery in Safavid Iran (c. 1502–1736 AD)

Slavery was a common institution in Safavid Iran, with slaves employed in many levels of society.  African slaves were imported by the East African slave trade across the Indian Ocean, and white slaves were mainly provided from the Caucasus area or the Caspian Sea through warfare and slave trade.

Slaves were procured through warfare, slave raids, by purchase or as gifts.  Prisoners of war (asīr) could be ransomed but were otherwise enslaved, and rebellions and upheavals such as the Afghan occupation (1722-1730) resulted in the enslavement of thousands; in these cases, the usual custom of only enslaving people of a different religion were overlooked.  Slave raids were conducted through which people were enslaved, and these were often directed toward Christians in the Caucasus region.  Slaves were imported from East Africa as well as from India via the Indian Ocean.  Finally, slaves were given as gifts: until 1780, the Christian Armenians were forced to regularly provide girls and male youths as tributes to the Safavid ruler; the Shah also gave slaves away, as diplomatic gifts to foreign ambassadors and to the ulema.

Both male and female slaves were employed by their masters as entertainers, dancing, playing music, serving  and by giving sexual services by prostitution at private parties.

Safavid harem

One of the biggest slavery institutions in Safavid Iran was the royal Safavid harem and court. Shah Sultan Hossain’s (r. 1694–1722) court has been estimated to include five thousand slaves; male and female, black and white, of which one hundred were black eunuchs. 
The monarchs of the Safavid dynasty preferred to procreate through slave concubines, which would neutralize potential ambitions from relatives and other inlaws and protect patrimony. The slave concubines (and later mothers) of the Shah's mainly consisted of enslaved Caucasian, Georgian and Armenian women, captured as war booty, bought at the slave market or received as gifts from local potentates.
Slave eunuchs performed various tasks in many levels of the harem as well as the general court.  Eunuchs had offices in the general court, such as in the royal treasury and as the tutors and adoptive fathers of non-castrated slaves selected to be slave soldiers, as well as inside the harem, and served as a channel between the secluded harem women and the outside court and world.

Slavery under Nader Shah and his successors (c. 1736–1796 AD)

Slavery in Qajar Iran (c. 1796–1925 AD)

Slave trade and supply
At the beginning of the 19th century both white and black, as well as indigenous, slaves were traded in Iran. Slaves were mainly obtained either through sale or warfare.  Children were sometimes sold into slavery by their poor families, often in Armenia, Southern Iran and Kurdistan.

White slaves were mainly provided from the Caucasus area or the Caspian Sea through warfare and slave trade.    White slaves were often provided through warfare such as the Russo-Iranian wars, tribal incursions, slave raids and punitive expeditions in Caucasus and Northern Iran, which provided for Christian Armenian, Georgian and Circassians, and for Muslim Iranians capture in slave raids by the Turkmens.

Inside Iran, non-Muslims, often Jewish women, were kidnapped from their homes, and Muslim tribespeople were kidnapped or taken as war prisoners during tribal warfare, often by Turkoman slave traders.   Normally, white and light skinned slaves were used for concubinage, while black slaves were used domestics (maids, nannies and eunuchs). 
In southeast Iran, slave raids were conducted by slavers, often local chieftains, as late as around 1900.  Muslim Iranian slaves were mainly sold to Arabia and Afghanistan, and it was said; “most of the slave girls employed as domestics in the houses of the gentry at Kandahar were brought from the outlying districts of Ghayn.”

African slaves were provided from East Africa via the Indian Ocean trade, but also increasingly through the Persian Gulf by Arab and Persian traders, or by land by pilgrims returning from Mecca, which caused Iranian to call the slaves haji.  Black slaves were mainly divided into Zangīs or Bambassee, who were imported from Zanzibar across the Indian Ocean; and Ḥabašīs from Ethiopia, Somalia (also called Souhalis and Nubees) and southern Sudan (also called Nubees).

Employment of slaves
As in previous times, slaves were used as eunuchs, domestic servants and concubines in the harems; as military men, administrative staff, or field laborers; it was considered a matter of status to have slaves in the household.  Visiting Europeans could also have slaves in their household during their stay, however their slaves could leave any moment they wished with the claim that as Muslims, they were not compelled to serve Christians.  Slaves owned by the Turkmen tribes were used to herd their flocks and till their land, and in southeast Iran slaves were almost exclusively held for agricultural labor.   The British consul reported that "in Beluchistan there are several hamlets inhabited by slaves, who till the Government’s property around Bampūr", and in Sīstān "the cultivators of the soil are, for the most part, Slaves both black and white."

The domestic slave pattern was similar in regard to the royal Qajar harem.  The wives and slave concubines of shah Fath-Ali Shah Qajar came from the harems of the vanquished houses of Zand and Afšār; from the Georgian and Armenian campaigns; as well as from the slave markets, and presented as gifts to the shah from the provinces.  The slave concubines of the harem were mainly white, dominantly Turkmen and Kurdish captives under the supervision of female chief called aqal (aḡūl).  Young slave boys below puberty (ḡolām-bačča) served as servants and playmates in the harem.  Eunuchs were mainly African slaves.  During the Qajar dynasty, slave soldiers, were used for the royal guard, and they were mainly white slaves from Caucasus.  Female slaves had in some aspects more freedom than free Muslim women, as they were allowed to move about alone outside of the harem without veils and mingle with men, and were less harshly punished for voluntarily extramarital sexual relationships.
Slaves were well-integrated into Iranian society. They intermarried with Persians, spoke Farsi and adopted Islam. British traveler Ella Sykes wrote that Iran was the "Paradise" for slaves.

Decline
The 1828 war with Russia put an end to the import of white slaves from the Russian Empire borderlands as it undermined the trade in Circassians and Georgians, which both Iran and neighboring Turkey had been practicing for quite some time.  When the number of white slaves diminished, free Iranian men were employed for the royal guards rather than the previous white . 
At the same time and under various pressures, the British Empire decided to curb the slave trade through the Indian Ocean. "In 1848, Mohammad Shah Qajar banned the importation of slaves by sea."
Consequently, by 1870 the trade in African slaves to Iran through the Indian Ocean had been significantly diminished.  It is noted that the position of the formerly powerful eunuchs of the royal harem diminished in this period because of their shrinking numbers.

Although the diplomatic efforts of the Russians and the British did result in a decline in the trade, slavery was still common in Iran under the Qajar dynasty, and it was not until the first half of twentieth century that slavery would be officially abolished in Iran under Reza Shah Pahlavi.  It is noted that poor parents still sold their children in to slavery, and that slave raids by chieftains were still conducted in the early 20th-century.

Modern Period

Abolition of slavery (1929 AD)

What ultimately led to the abolition of the slave trade and the emancipation of slaves in Iran were internal pressures for reform. On February 7, 1929 the Iranian National Parliament ratified an anti-slavery bill that outlawed the slave trade or any other claim of ownership over human beings. The bill also empowered the government to take immediate action for the emancipation of all slaves.
Original text of Iranian Slavery Abolition Act of 1929 is as follows:

Slavery after abolition

See also

 History of slavery in the Muslim world
 Slavery in 21st-century Islamism
 Slavery in modern Africa
 Slavery in antiquity

References

Further reading 

Last number(s) indicate pages:

Anthony A. Lee, “Enslaved African Women in Nineteenth-Century Iran: The Life of Fezzeh Khanom of Shiraz,” Iranian Studies (May 2012).

History of Iran by topic
Slavery in Iran
Human rights abuses in Iran